No Crying at the Dinner Table is a Canadian short documentary film, directed by Carol Nguyen and released in 2019. An exploration of the common stigma in Asian families against expressing emotional vulnerability, the film centres on interviews Nguyen conducted with her family, played back around the dinner table at a family gathering.

The film premiered at the 2019 Toronto International Film Festival. In December 2019, the film was named to TIFF's annual year-end Canada's Top Ten list for short films.

The film received a Canadian Screen Award nomination for Best Short Documentary at the 8th Canadian Screen Awards in 2020.

References

External links

2019 short documentary films
Canadian short documentary films
2010s Canadian films
Films about Vietnamese Canadians